Ozyorny is a rural locality (a settlement) in Novokhopyorsk, Novokhopyorsky District, Voronezh Oblast, Russia. The population was 239 as of 2010. There are 3 streets.

Geography 
Ozyorny is located 17 km northeast of Novokhopyorsk (the district's administrative centre) by road. Oktyabrskoye is the nearest rural locality.

References 

Populated places in Novokhopyorsky District